António Prieto Velasco (born 11 January 1958 in Hontoria, Segovia) is a retired long-distance runner from Spain, who represented his native country three times in the men's 10,000 metres at the Summer Olympics, starting in 1980 (Moscow, Soviet Union).

Achievements

References

Spanish Olympic Committee

1958 births
Living people
Spanish male long-distance runners
Athletes (track and field) at the 1980 Summer Olympics
Athletes (track and field) at the 1984 Summer Olympics
Athletes (track and field) at the 1988 Summer Olympics
Olympic athletes of Spain
Mediterranean Games bronze medalists for Spain
Mediterranean Games medalists in athletics
Athletes (track and field) at the 1983 Mediterranean Games